Bromus arizonicus is a species of brome grass known by the common name Arizona brome.

It is native to the Southwestern United States, California, and Baja California, where it grows in many types of grassy valley and desert habitat.

Description

References

External links
Jepson Manual Treatment
USDA Plants Profile
Photo gallery

arizonicus
Bunchgrasses of North America
Native grasses of California
Grasses of the United States
Flora of Arizona
Flora of Baja California
Flora of the California desert regions
Flora of the Sierra Nevada (United States)
Flora of the Southwestern United States
Natural history of the California chaparral and woodlands
Natural history of the California Coast Ranges
Natural history of the Mojave Desert
Natural history of the Peninsular Ranges
Natural history of the Transverse Ranges